The Mercedes-Benz M124 engine is a prototype supercharged, 5.8-liter, straight-8 engine; made by Mercedes-Benz in 1939.

Applications
1939 Mercedes-Benz 580K (W129) (prototype)

References

Mercedes-Benz engines
Straight-eight engines
Engines by model
Gasoline engines by model